Loïc Kouagba (born 9 June 1994) is a French professional footballer who plays as a defender for Championnat National club Red Star.

Career
On 24 June 2018, Kouagba signed a professional contract with Béziers. He made his professional debut with Béziers in a 1–1 (6–5) shootout loss in the Coupe de la Ligue to Orléans on 14 August 2018. He joined Marignane Gignac on loan in January 2019.

In August 2019 Kouagba moved to Dunkerque, signing a one-year deal. On 6 January 2022, he moved to Red Star.

Personal life
Born in France, Kouagba is of Ivorian descent.

References

External links
 
 

1994 births
Living people
French sportspeople of Ivorian descent
Sportspeople from Boulogne-Billancourt
French footballers
Footballers from Hauts-de-Seine
Association football defenders
AS Béziers (2007) players
FC Martigues players
CS Sedan Ardennes players
Marignane Gignac Côte Bleue FC players
USL Dunkerque players
Red Star F.C. players
Ligue 2 players
Championnat National players
Championnat National 2 players
Championnat National 3 players